João Paulo Lázaro Lucas (born 15 January 1996) is a Portuguese professional footballer who plays as a left-back for Amora.

Club career
On 31 July 2016, Lucas made his professional debut with Leixões in a 2016–17 Taça da Liga match against Cova da Piedade.

On 29 June 2021, Lucas joined Académica de Coimbra. On 26 June 2022, he signed for French club Paris 13 Atletico.

In January 2023, Lucas returned to Portugal and signed with Amora.

References

External links

Stats and profile at LPFP 

1996 births
Living people
Sportspeople from Almada
Portuguese footballers
Association football defenders
Primeira Liga players
Liga Portugal 2 players
Segunda Divisão players
Championnat National players
Sporting CP footballers
C.F. Os Belenenses players
S.L. Benfica footballers
Sport Benfica e Castelo Branco players
Leixões S.C. players
C.D. Santa Clara players
Associação Académica de Coimbra – O.A.F. players
Paris 13 Atletico players
Amora F.C. players
Portuguese expatriate footballers
Expatriate footballers in France
Portuguese expatriate sportspeople in France